A compulsory cartel or forced cartel is a cartel that is established or maintained by an administrative order or by a legal directive. The interference of policies on these associations of entrepreneurs of the same trade varied. It ranged from a mere decision to establish a cartel or to maintain an existing one, to a strict state control.

Disagreement over the nature of compulsory cartels 
The understanding of “compulsory cartels” as “cartels” has always been disputed. While the older cartel experts before the 1930s usually insisted in the free entrepreneurial will that constituted a “cartel”, later authors were more tolerant and accepted forced cartels as an exception. In recent times (2007), the economic-historian Jeffrey R. Fear took this stance of the “exception to the rule” that would not contradict the general nature of these organizations. The cartel-historian Holm Arno Leonhardt has positioned himself more differentiated in 2013: Forced cartels that were embedded in a totalitarian planning economy or were by other means unable to realize their own will, should be regarded as organs or appendages of another system. Thus, “compulsory cartels” without a permanent political influence could indeed constitute real “cartels”, while others being under strict control acted mainly as servants of an alien will.

Types of compulsory cartels
A compulsory cartel is a group of businesses that collude together with the government to limit competition within an industry or market, by installing a cartel agreement, which is directly or indirectly enforced by the government. The cartel agreement regulates the means of production or the distribution of goods and services in a goods and services category (market segment), which is a form of economic interventionism. For example a directly enforced cartel of workers is created when a minimum wage is established by law, which eliminates the market economy only to workers with a productivity below the minimum wage, like starters.

There are also cartels that eliminate the market economy for a category of goods or services. An example is the corona vaccination program in The Netherlands. The government may sets a mandatory basic health care 'insurance' policy implementing a Marxist egalitarian distribution of medical goods and services according to a necessity scheme. An example is the British NHS. But a market economy in healthcare was maintained that implicitly makes the patients to renounce NHS health care, when contracting for private health care. No market economy for basic health care insurances and basic medical goods and services was ultimately left in the Dutch healthcare system which is a form of 'welfare-state capitalism'. These insurance companies are privately owned and receive enormous amounts of tax money from the government as part of the 'cartel agreement' that resulted in the creation of the public insurance cartel and the health care provider cartel.  Note that the former cartel has to accept all patients and competes to reduce spending on reimbursements, which can be achieved when the later cartel becomes subject to a cartel agreement negotiated between the insurance companies and the health care providers. This agreement resulted in the elimination of a market economy in health care goods and services distribution, i.e patients cannot buy health care, including preventive healthcare like blood tests, colonoscopies and MRI scans. In this case the cartel agreement was the indirect result of regulation and set by the insurance cartel instead of directly by the government. This is described a 'market economy eliminating welfare-state cartel', or in the spirit of Milton Friedman, economic totalitarianism in a market segment.

'Economic totalitarianism' is a term used by Milton Friedman in Capitalism and Freedom:
History suggests only that capitalism is a necessary condition for political freedom. Clearly it is not a sufficient condition. Fascist Italy and Fascist Spain, Germany at various times in the last seventy years, Japan before World Wars I and II, tzarist Russia in the decades before World War I -- are all societies that cannot conceivably be described as politically free. Yet, in each, private enterprise was the dominant form of economic organization. It is therefore clearly possible to have economic arrangements that are fundamentally capitalist and political arrangements that are not free. Even in those societies, the citizenry had a good deal more freedom than citizens of a modern totalitarian state like Russia or Nazi Germany, in which economic totalitarianism is combined with political totalitarianism. Even in Russia under the Tzars, it was possible for some citizens, under some circumstances, to change their jobs without getting permission from political authority because capitalism and the existence of private property provided some check to the centralized power of the state. - Friedman, 1962

Examples
 German potash syndicate: This was since 1919 a public-law body and was integrated into a control structure with its customers, laborers, traders and instances of administration.
 Japanese steel cartel of the 1930s.
 Rhenish-Westphalian Coal Syndicate, Northwest Germany: This too was since 1919 a public body and integrated into a similar control structure as the German potash syndicate.
 Russian sugar syndicate of the 1890s.

Bibliography
 Fear, Jeffrey R.: Cartels. In: Geoffrey Jones; Jonathan Zeitlin (ed.): The Oxford handbook of business history. Oxford: Univ. Press, 2007, p. 268-293.
 Leonhardt, Holm Arno: Kartelltheorie und Internationale Beziehungen. Theoriegeschichtliche Studien, Hildesheim 2013.
 Korrell, Emil: Zwangskartelle als Mittel gegen ruinöse Konkurrenz. Forchheim 1937.
 Liefmann, Robert: Cartels, Concerns and Trusts, Ontario 2001 [London 1932]

References